Carlos Nuno Tavares Calado (born October 5, 1975 in Alcanena, Médio Tejo) is an athlete from Portugal, Sporting CP and S.L. Benfica, who specialises in the long jump.

He was at his peak in 2001 when he won bronze medals at both the World Indoor and Outdoor Championships and set the indoor national record of 8.22 metres. His outdoor personal best of 8.36 metres, set in 1997, is also the national record.

His last major competition was in triple jump at the European Indoor Championships in early 2005, where he was knocked out in the qualifying round.

Achievements

Personal bests
Long jump - 8.36 m (1997)
Triple jump - 17.08 m (1996)
100 metres - 10.11 s (1999)
200 metres - 20.90 s (1997)

References

1975 births
Living people
People from Alcanena
Portuguese male long jumpers
Portuguese male triple jumpers
Athletes (track and field) at the 1996 Summer Olympics
Athletes (track and field) at the 2000 Summer Olympics
Olympic athletes of Portugal
World Athletics Championships medalists
Sportspeople from Santarém District